Surada (Sl. No.: 129) is a Vidhan Sabha constituency of Ganjam district, Odisha.

Area of this constituency includes Surada NAC, Belaguntha NAC, Surada Block and Belaguntha Block.

Elected Members

14 elections held during 1957 to 2014. List of members elected from Surada constituency are:

2014: (129): Purna Chandra Swain (BJD)
2009: (129): Purna Chandra Swain (BJD)
2004: (67): Kisore Chandra Singh Deo (BJP)
2000: (67): Usha Rani Panda (Congress)
1995: (67): Ananta Narayan Singh Deo (BJP)
1990: (67): Shanti Devi (Janata Party)
1985: (67): Sarat Chandra Panda (Congress)
1980: (67): Gayatri Swain (Congress-I)
1977: (67): Ananta Narayan Singh Deo (Janata Party)
1974: (67): Sarat Chandra Panda (Congress) 
1971: (63): Ananta Narayan Singh Deo (Swatantra Party)
1967: (63): Ananta Narayan Singh Deo (Swatantra Party)
1961: (28): Arjun Nayak (Congress)
1957: (22): Biju Patnaik (Congress)

2019 Election Result

2014 Election Result
In 2014 election, Biju Janata Dal candidate Purna Chandra Swain defeated  Indian National Congress candidate Basanta Kumar Bisoyi by a margin of 16,000 votes.

2009 Election Result
In 2009 election, Biju Janata Dal candidate Purna Chandra Swain, defeated Independent candidate Nilamani Bisoyi by 4,011 votes.

Notes

References

Assembly constituencies of Odisha
Politics of Ganjam district